Giuseppe Antonio Borgnis (Frenchified as Joseph Antoine Borgnis) 1781–1863, was an Italian engineer, professor of Applied mathematics and then of Architecture at the University of Pavia. His book Théorie de la mécanique usuelle is considered by historian Donald Cardwell to be one of the great engineering textbooks of the early 19th century.

Biography

Works 

Traité complet de mécanique appliquée aux art, 1818
 
 
 
 
 
 
 
 
Théorie de la mécanique usuelle, ou Introduction à l'étude de la mécanique appliquée aux arts, 1821.
Traité élémentaire de construction appliquée à l'architecture civile, 1823; 1838.
Dictionnaire de mécanique appliquée aux arts, 1823.
Elementi di statica architettonica, 1842.

References

French engineers
1863 deaths
1781 births
Italian engineers
People from Craveggia